Comedia (Comedy) is the third solo album by Héctor Lavoe. It was released on 1978 under the label of Fania Records. It is notable for the song "El Cantante", which was written by Rubén Blades.

Track listing

 "El Cantante" – 10:23
 "Comedia" - 3:28
 "La Verdad" - 5:30
 "Tiempos Pasados" - 4:26
 "Bandolera" - 9:32
 "¿Por Qué Te Conocí?" - 4:47
 "Songoro Cosongo" - 7:50

Personnel
Héctor Lavoe - Vocals
Salvador Cuevas - Bass
Gilberto Colon - Piano
Jose Rodriguez - Trombone
Reinaldo Jorge - Trombone
Luis E. Ortiz - Trumpet
Jose Febles - Trumpet
Milton Cardona - Conga ("El Cantante" & "La Verdad" only)
Eddie Montalvo - Conga
Steve Berrios - Timbales & Percussion ("El Cantante" & "La Verdad" only)
Jose Cigno - Drums (except "El Cantante" & "La Verdad")
Alfredo De La Fé - Violin ("El Cantante")

Coros:

Jose Mangual
Milton Cardona
Willie Colón
Eddie Natal
Héctor Lavoe
Recorded at La Tierra Sound Studios, New York City
Audio Engineers: Jon Fausty, Mario Salvati, Irv Greenbaum
Mixed by: Willie Colón
"Bandolera" mixed by Jon Fausty
Produced by Willie Colón
Willie Colón (Arrangements) 
Luis Ortiz (Arrangements)
José Febles (Arrangements)
Edwin Rodríguez (Arrangements)

1978 albums
Héctor Lavoe albums
Fania Records albums